Andrés Péres Thomas (born November 10, 1963) is a former professional baseball player who played in the Major Leagues primarily as a shortstop for the Atlanta Braves from 1985-1990. He batted and threw right-handed.  Thomas brought a power bat to the shortstop position for the Braves (13 HR each in 1988 and 1989); however, he struck out quite a bit (95 Ks in 1988) and walked only 59 times in five seasons.  His free-swinging prompted then-Braves' broadcaster Don Sutton to ask hypothetically during games, "Why would you even throw him a strike?" He was also an erratic fielder, leading all NL shortstops with 29 errors in 1988.

He was the manager of the Detroit Tigers' affiliate in the Dominican Summer League for 2006

References

External links
 Baseball Reference

1963 births
Atlanta Braves players
Canton-Akron Indians players
Dominican Republic expatriate baseball players in the United States

Living people
Major League Baseball shortstops
Major League Baseball players from the Dominican Republic
Anderson Braves players
Durham Bulls players
Gulf Coast Braves players
Greenville Braves players
Omaha Royals players
Phoenix Firebirds players
Richmond Braves players
Dominican Republic expatriate baseball players in Italy
Grosseto Baseball Club players
Dominican Republic expatriate baseball people in Canada